Battle of Tomaszów Mazowiecki refers to the battle on 6 September 1939 near the town of Tomaszów Mazowiecki, Second Polish Republic, during the Invasion of Poland.

The area was defended by Polish 13th Infantry Division under Col. Władysław Kaliński, and Germany's assault was carried by two armored divisions of the 16th Panzer Corps. After the day-long battle, German forces broke through the Polish defences and took the town. Polish 13th Division sustained heavy losses and was forced to retreat towards Warsaw.

See also 

Tomaszow Mazowiecki
Łódź Voivodeship (1919–1939)
September 1939 events

 List of World War II military equipment of Poland
 List of German military equipment of World War II